TATA box-binding protein-like protein 1 is a protein that in humans is encoded by the TBPL1 gene.

Function 

Initiation of transcription by RNA polymerase II requires the activities of more than 70 polypeptides. The protein that coordinates these activities is transcription factor IID (TFIID), which binds to the core promoter to position the polymerase properly, serves as the scaffold for assembly of the remainder of the transcription complex, and acts as a channel for regulatory signals. TFIID is composed of the TATA-binding protein (TBP) and a group of evolutionarily conserved proteins known as TBP-associated factors or TAFs. TAFs may participate in basal transcription, serve as coactivators, function in promoter recognition or modify general transcription factors (GTFs) to facilitate complex assembly and transcription initiation. This gene encodes a protein that serves the same function as TBP and substitutes for TBP at some promoters that are not recognized by TFIID. It is essential for spermiogenesis and believed to be important in expression of developmentally regulated genes.

Interactions 

TBPL1 has been shown to interact with GTF2A1.

References

Further reading

External links 
 

Transcription factors